Varapogum Sooriyane is a 2005 Indian Tamil language drama film directed by S. Karuppusamy. The film stars Trivikram and Priyanjali, with Ahuti Prasad, Ramesh Kanna, Duraipandian, Seetha and Sathyapriya playing supporting roles. The film, produced by C. R. Rajan, had musical score by Deva and was released in 2005.

Plot

The film opens with a village panchayat, the village head disowns his daughter Annapoorni (Seetha) for marrying the illiterate labourer Shanmugam (Ahuti Prasad). After giving birth to her son, Annapoorni dies but not before getting a promise from her husband that he will make their son an educated and respected man.

Many years later, Shanmugam's son Sakthivel (Trivikram) is a bright student who obtains a master's degree with distinction. Shanmugam wants his son to become an IPS officer. Kavitha (Priyanjali), the daughter of the local rich landlord, falls in love with Sakthivel. Kavitha's father (Duraipandian), who wants his daughter to marry an IPS officer, asks Sakthivel to marry his daughter. First reluctant, Sakthivel accepts after the insistence of Shanmugam. Meanwhile, Kavitha's uncle Karuppusamy (Ramesh Kanna), a nothing-for-good, wants to marry Kavitha at any cost. Sakthivel and Kavitha get engaged, and Sakthivel then leaves the village to attend the IPS interview in Delhi. The day of the wedding, Sakthivel returns to the village and announces that he did not attend the interview. Kavitha's father then cancels the wedding and Karuppusamy humiliates Sakthivel and his father in front of the villagers.

Sakthivel explains to his father that he had to perform the last rites of his teacher (Gowthami Vembunathan) who took care of him when he was young. Therefore, he could not make it on time to attend the interview. Sakthivel promises his father and his lover that he will become an IPS officer and he gets a second chance to attend the interview. The day of the interview, Karuppusamy send goons to kill Sakthivel but Sakthivel manages to beat them all. Sakthivel returns to the village in a police uniform after passing the interview. The villagers praise Sakthivel thus making his father proud. Karuppusamy apologizes for his behaviour to Shanmugam and Kavitha's father accepts for the wedding.

Cast

Trivikram as Sakthivel
Priyanjali as Kavitha
Ahuti Prasad as Shanmugam
Ramesh Kanna as Karuppusamy
Duraipandian as Kavitha's father
Seetha as Annapoorni
Sathyapriya as Karuppusamy's mother
Sempuli Jagan as Vellaisamy, Karuppusamy's friend
Kadugu Ramamurthy as Kadugu, Karuppusamy's friend
Dancer Gopi as Aadu, Karuppusamy's friend
Devan as Police commissioner
Nambirajan as Annapoorni's father
Balu Anand as Balu Anand
Ajay Rathnam as Officer
 Gowthami Vembunathan as Teacher
Anjali Devi as Dhanalakshmi, Kavitha's mother
Chelladurai as Traffic officer
Bayilvan Ranganathan as Head constable
Vellai Subbaiah as Priest
Tirupur Ramasamy as Newspaper delivery employee
Kovai Senthil as Villager
Sridhar in a special appearance

Production
S. Karuppusamy, an assistant to K. Bhagyaraj, Vikraman, V. Sekhar and Arjun Sarja, made his directorial debut with Varapogum Sooriyane under the banner of Divyashethra Films. He introduced a new pair: Trivikram and Priyanjali from Telugu cinema for the lead pair. Ahuti Prasad, the Telugu artist was selected to play the role of the hero's father while Seetha played the hero's mother. "The film tells about how a son should respect his father and the way a father should bring up the son", claimed S. Karuppusamy, the director who had also written the story, screenplay and dialogues of the film.

Soundtrack

The film score and the soundtrack were composed by Deva. The soundtrack, released in 2005, features 6 tracks written by P. Vijay, Snehan, Kalai Kumar and Vijayasagar.

Reception
Sify described the film as "avoidable" and said, "It has clichéd scenes, melodrama, sweat and tears that you may have seen in so many village stories of the '80s. In the presentation, the film is outdated and totally predictable [..] There is nothing really to recommend in this film, even the music of Deva is a big letdown". A reviewer wrote, "Debutants Trivikram and Priyanjali are just ok. Ahudi Prasad, as the poor illiterate father has given a good performance" and added, "the movie lacks pace. Certain melodramatic scenes could have been avoided which would have made the film more presentable". Malini Mannath stated, "the whole set-up coupled with a storyline and a narrative style that would have suited the '60s more, rounding off into an unexciting adventure for the viewers".

References

2005 films
2000s Tamil-language films
Indian drama films
Films scored by Deva (composer)
2005 directorial debut films
2005 drama films